A gas carrier, gas tanker, LPG carrier, or LPG tanker is a ship designed to transport LPG, LNG, CNG, or liquefied chemical gases in bulk.

Types

Fully pressurized gas carrier

The seaborne transport of liquefied gases began in 1934 when a major international company put two combined oil/LPG tankers into operation. The ships, basically oil tankers, had been converted by fitting small, riveted, pressure vessels for the carriage of LPG into cargo tank spaces. This enabled transport over long distances of substantial volumes of an oil refinery by-product that had distinct advantages as a domestic and commercial fuel. LPG is not only odourless and non-toxic, it also has a high calorific value and a low sulphur content, making it very clean and efficient when being burnt.

Today, most fully pressurised oceangoing LPG carriers are fitted with two or three horizontal, cylindrical or spherical cargo tanks and have typical capacities between 20,000 and 90,000 cubic meters and Length overall ranging from 140 m to 229 m . New LPG Carrier ships are designed for dual-fuel propulsion system possessing the ability to utilize LPG or diesel fuel on a selective basis. Fully pressurized ships are still being built in numbers and represent a cost-effective, simple way of moving LPG to and from smaller gas terminals.

Semi-pressurised ships

These ships carried gases in a semi-pressurized/semi-refrigerated state. This approach provides flexibility, as these carriers are able to load or discharge at both refrigerated and pressurized storage facilities.

Ethylene and gas/chemical carriers

Fully refrigerated ships

They are built to carry liquefied gases at low temperature and atmospheric pressure between terminals equipped with fully refrigerated storage tanks. However, discharge through a booster pump and cargo heater makes it possible to discharge to pressurized tanks too. The first purpose-built, lpg tanker was the m/t Rasmus Tholstrup from a Swedish shipyard to a Danish design. Prismatic tanks enabled the ship's cargo carrying capacity to be maximised, thus making fully refrigerated ships highly suitable for carrying large volumes of cargo such as LPG, ammonia and vinyl chloride over long distances. LPG carriers in the  size range are often referred to as VLGCs (Very Large Gas Carriers). Although LNG carriers are often larger in terms of cubic capacity, this term is normally only applied to fully refrigerated LPG carriers.

The main type of cargo containment system utilised on board modern fully refrigerated ships are independent tanks with rigid foam insulation. The insulation used is quite commonly polyurethane foam. Older ships can have independent tanks with loosely filled perlite insulation. In the past, there have been a few fully refrigerated ships built with semi-membrane or integral tanks and internal insulation tanks, but these systems have only maintained minimal interest. The large majority of such ships currently in service have been constructed by shipbuilders in Japan and Korea.

Liquefied natural gas carriers

In the modern fleet of LNG carriers, there is an interesting exception concerning ship size. This is the introduction of several smaller ships of between  having been built in 1994 and later to service the needs of importers of smaller volumes.

Compressed natural gas carriers

Compressed natural gas (CNG) carrier ships are designed for transportation of natural gas under high pressure.  CNG carrier technology relies on high pressure, typically over 250 bar (2900 psi), to increase the density of the gas and maximize the possible commercial payload. CNG carriers are economical for medium distance marine transport  and rely on the adoption of suitable pressure vessels to store CNG during transport and on the use of suitable loading and unloading compressors to receive the CNG at the loading terminal and to deliver the CNG at the unloading terminal.

Builders
These vessels are designed to transport liquefied gas. Builders of Liquefied Gas Carriers are:
Daewoo Shipbuilding & Marine
Damen Shipyard
Hyundai Heavy Industries
Hyundai Mipo
Hyundai Samho Heavy Industries
Jiangnan
Kawasaki Shipbuilding Corporation
Mitsubishi Heavy Industries

South Korea, Japan and China are the main countries where LPG tankers are built, with small numbers built in the Netherlands and Bangladesh.

Cargoes carried on gas carriers
Butadiene
Ethylene
LPG
LNG
CNG
Propylene
Chemical gases such as ammonia, vinyl chloride, ethylene oxide, propylene oxide and chlorine.

Gas carrier codes
The Gas Codes, developed by International Maritime Organization apply to all gas carriers regardless of size. There are three Gas Codes and these are described below.

Gas carriers built after June 1986 (the IGC Code). The IGCCode which applies to new gas carriers (built after 30 June 1986) is the International Code for the Construction and Equipment of Ships Carrying Liquefied Gases in Bulk. In brief, this Code is known as the IGC Code. The IGC Code, under amendments to International Convention for the Safety of Life at Sea (SOLAS), is mandatory for all new ships. As proof that a ship complies with the Code, an International Certificate of Fitness for the Carriage of Liquefied Gases in Bulk should be on board.
In 1993, the IGC Code was amended and the new rules came into effect on 1 July 1994. Ships on which construction started on or after 1 October 1994 should apply the amended version of the Code but ships built earlier may comply with previous editions of the IGC Code.

Gas carriers built between 1976 and 1986 (the GC Code)
The regulations covering gas carriers built after 1976 but before July 1986 are included in the Code for the Construction and Equipment of Ships Carrying Liquefied Gases in Bulk. It is known as the Gas Carrier Code or GC Code in short.
Since 1975, International Maritime Organization (IMO) has approved four sets of amendments to the GC Code. The latest was adopted in June 1993. All amendments are not necessarily agreed by every government. Although this Code is not mandatory, many countries have implemented it into national law. Accordingly, most charterers will expect such ships to meet with Code standards and, as proof of this, to have on board a Certificate of Fitness for the Carriage of Liquefied Gases in Bulk.

Gas carriers built before 1977 (the Existing Ship Code)
The regulations covering gas carriers built before 1977 are contained in the Code for Existing Ships Carrying Liquefied Gases in Bulk. Its content is similar to the GC Code, though less extensive.
The Existing Ship Code was completed in 1976 after the GC Code had been written. It therefore summarises current shipbuilding practice at that time. It remains as an IMO recommendation for all gas carriers in this older fleet of ships. The Code is not mandatory but is applied by some countries for ship registration and in other countries as a necessary fulfilment prior to port entry. Accordingly, many ships of this age are required by charterers to meet with Code standards and to have on board a Certificate of Fitness for the Carriage of Liquefied Gases in Bulk.

Cargo containment systems

A cargo containment system is the total arrangement for containing cargo including, where fitted:

A primary barrier (the cargo tank),
Secondary barrier (if fitted),
Associated thermal insulation,
Any intervening spaces, and
Adjacent structure, if necessary, for the support of these elements.

For cargoes carried at temperatures between  the ship's hull may act as the secondary barrier and in such cases it may be a boundary of the hold space.

The basic cargo tank types utilised on board gas carriers are in accordance with the list below:

Independent Type

 Independent Type 'A'
Type A Independent Tanks are prismatic and supported on insulation-bearing blocks typically consisting of wooden chocks and located by anti-roll chocks located at the top of the tank inside the void space and anti-flotation chocks located inside the void space usually just above the double bottom tanks. The tanks are normally divided by a centreline liquid-tight bulkhead; by this feature, together with the chamfered upper
part of the tank, the free liquid surface effect is reduced and thus the virtual rise of the Centre of gravity and the stability is increased. When these cargo tanks are designed to carry LPG (at −50 °C), the tank is constructed of fine-grained low-carbon manganese steel or even stainless steel as seen in the Maersk J class Ships. The hold space (void space) in this design is normally filled with dry inert gas or Nitrogen but may be ventilated with air during a ballast or gas free passage. The Conch design has been developed for carriage of LNG (at-163oC). The material for these cargo tanks has to be either 9% nickel steel or aluminium. The maximum allowable relief vapour setting (MARVS) is < 0. 7 bar.

 Independent Type 'B'
Type B Independent Tanks are generally spherical and welded to a vertical cylindrical skirt, which is the lone connection to the ship's main hull. The hold space (void space) in this design is normally filled with dry inert gas or Nitrogen but may be ventilated with air during a ballast or gas free passage. A protective steel dome covers the primary barrier above deck level, and insulation encloses the outside of the primary barrier surface. This containment system has been used for carriage of LNG. The material of construction is either 9% nickel steel or aluminium. The maximum Allowable relief vapour setting (MARVS) is < 0. 7 bar.

 Independent Type 'C'
Type C Independent Tanks are deck pressure vessels or cylindrical pressure tanks mounted horizontally on two or more cradle-shaped foundations. The tanks may be fitted on, below or partly below deck and be both longitudinally and transversely located. Lobe-type tanks are commonly used at the forward end of the ship, to improve the poor utilization of the hull volume. This containment system is used for LPG, Ethylene and small scale LNG carriers. The material, if used for the construction of tanks designed to carry ethylene, is 5% nickel steel. The maximum Allowable relief vapour setting (MARVS) is > 0. 7 bar.

Membrane

Some other types such as:
 Internal insulation Type '1'
 Internal insulation Type '2'
 Integral

have been fully designed and approved but have not been commercially used yet.

Hazards on gas carriers
 Toxicity
Vinyl chloride commonly carried on gas carriers is a known as a human carcinogen, particularly liver cancer. It is not only dangerous when inhaled but can also be absorbed by the skin. Skin irritation and watering of the eyes indicate dangerous levels of VCM may be present in the atmosphere. Caution must be exerted while dealing with such cargoes, precautions such as use of Chemical suits Self-contained Breathing Apparatus (SCBA's) and gas tight goggles must be worn at all times to prevent exposure. Chlorine and ammonia are other toxic cargoes carried.
 Flammability
Almost all cargo vapours are flammable.  When ignition occurs, it is not the liquid which burns but the evolved vapour that burns. Flameless explosions which result out of cold cargo liquid coming into sudden contact with water do not release much energy. Pool fires which are the result of a leaked pool of cargo liquid catching fire and jet fires which are the result of the leak catching fire are grave hazards. Flash fires occur when there is a leak and does not ignite immediately but after the vapours travel some distance downwind and getting ignited and are extremely dangerous. Vapour cloud explosions and boiling liquid expanding vapor explosions are the most grave flammability hazards on gas carriers.
 Frostbite
 Asphyxia
Asphyxia occurs when the blood cannot take a sufficient supply of oxygen to the brain. A person affected may experience headache, dizziness and inability to concentrate, followed by loss of consciousness. In sufficient concentrations any vapour may cause asphyxiation, whether toxic or not.

Health effects of specific cargoes carried on gas carriers
 Hazards of ammonia
1.  Exposure to more than 2,000 ppm – fatal in 30 minutes, 6,000 ppm – fatal in minutes, 10,000 ppm – fatal and intolerable to unprotected skin.

2. Anhydrous ammonia is not dangerous when handled properly, but if not handled carefully it can be extremely dangerous. It is not as combustible as many other products that we use and handle every day. However, concentrations of gas burn and require precautions to avoid fires.

3. Mild exposure can cause irritation to eye, nose and lung tissues. Prolonged breathing can cause suffocation. When large amounts are inhaled, the throat swells shut and victims suffocate. Exposure to vapours or liquid also can cause blindness

4. The water-absorbing nature of anhydrous ammonia that causes the greatest injury (especially to the eyes, nose, throat or lungs), and which can cause permanent damage. It is a colourless gas at atmospheric pressure and normal temperature, but under pressure readily changes into a liquid. Anhydrous ammonia has a high affinity for water. Anhydrous ammonia is a hygroscopic compound, this means it will seek moisture source that may be the body of the operator, which is composed of 90 percent water. When a human body is exposed to anhydrous ammonia the chemical freeze burns its way into the skin, eyes or lungs. This attraction places the eyes, lungs, and skin at greatest risk because of their high moisture content. Caustic burns result when the anhydrous ammonia dissolves into body tissue. Most deaths from anhydrous ammonia are caused by severe damage to the throat and lungs from a direct blast to the face. An additional concern is the low boiling point of anhydrous ammonia. The chemical freezes on contact at room temperature. It will cause burns similar to, but more severe than, those caused by dry ice. If exposed to severe cold flesh will become frozen. At first, the skin will become red (but turn subsequently white); the affected area is painless, but hard to touch, if left untreated the flesh will die and may become gangrenous.

5. The human eye is a complex organ made up of about 80 percent water. Ammonia under pressure can cause extensive, almost immediate damage to the eye. The ammonia extracts the fluid and destroys eye cells and tissue in minutes.

6. Draining of ammonia into sea while pre-cooling of the hard-arm or during disconnection operations is not an eco-friendly operation. As a small quantity of ammonia as low as (LC50) is hazardous to Salmon as per ICSC, USA. Consumption of such fish could be dangerous to humans.

See also

List of gas carriers
List of tankers
LNG carrier
Merchant navy

References

External links

Gas Tanker Advanced Course
  UK P&I Club The carriage of liquefied gases
 Society of International Gas Tanker and Terminal Operators World LNG Industry Standards

 
Merchant ships
Ship types
Petroleum transport